Adrienne Adeana Young is a Charlottesville, Virginia-based singer, songwriter, and multi-instrumentalist.  She is founder and operator of AddieBelle Music which produces her recordings.

History 
A native of Tallahassee, Florida, in fact a seventh-generation Floridian, she was raised on the land farmed by her family generations earlier.  Young grew up in a musical family in Clearwater, where she was a member of the band Big White Undies.

She was graduated magna cum laude from Belmont University in Nashville with a music business/Spanish degree. Endless and unfulfilling clerical jobs along Music Row motivated this triple-threat singer, writer, and multi-instrumentalist to start her own record label, Addiebelle Music. She also formed the short-lived band Liters of Pop with Eric McConnell.

She learned to play clawhammer-style banjo from Ketch Secor of Old Crow Medicine Show, and set about amassing a catalog of old-time tunes.  As she says:

Young began gaining attention with her 2003 win in the Chris Austin songwriting contest at MerleFest for "Sadie's Song".  Co-written with Mark D. Sanders, the song is a re-telling of the murderous bluegrass standard "Little Sadie" told from the victim's point of view.

Recordings 

"Little Sadie" featured prominently on her first CD, Plow to the End of the Row, produced with another Nashville-based musician, Will Kimbrough, and released on her own AddieBelle record label.  (The label takes its name from a nickname Young was given while working as a tour guide at Nashville's Belle Meade Mansion.)  The CD, which includes a packet of wildflower seeds along with artwork based on the Farmers' Almanac, was nominated for a Grammy Award for Best Album Package.

An early version of Plow to the End of the Row, released in 2003, has become a sought-after collectible.  That version included several tracks with Young backed by Old Crow Medicine Show and was a top pick for 2003 Debut Artist by the Freeform American Roots DJ Chart.  The nationally-released version, featuring different sequencing, new tracks, and re-recorded versions of several songs, was released on April 13, 2004, one day before an interview with Young aired on NPR's All Things Considered.  The Americana Music Association included Young and her band in their nominees for Emerging Artist of the Year, and the Nashville Scene named "Home Remedy" as Best Country Single of the year.  The CD went on to place at or near the top of numerous "best of" lists for the year and the Los Angeles Times called Young "the Americana music find of the year."

Young and her band Little Sadie (at the time, Tyler Grant on guitar, Clayton Campbell on fiddle and mandolin, Amanda Kowalski on bass, and Steven Sandifer on percussion) toured extensively across the U.S. and in England.  The members of the band left to pursue other projects prior to the recording of Young's second CD, The Art of Virtue.

That disc, released on June 28, 2005, took its theme from Benjamin Franklin's Thirteen Virtues.  A copy of Franklin's pamphlet is included with the CD.  Will Kimbrough co-produced the CD and co-wrote several tracks.  Alongside original songs and traditional tunes, the disc featured a cover of the Grateful Dead song "Brokedown Palace".  Young's AddieBelle label struck a distribution deal with Ryko Records which insured that her music got placed in more record stores.  She also continued to receive support from public radio and was invited to appear on World Cafe, Mountain Stage, and A Prairie Home Companion.  With a new incarnation of Little Sadie (fiddler and banjoist Eric Merrill, guitarist Hans Holzen, bassist Kyle Kegerreis, and percussionist Eric Platz), Young toured even more extensively in 2005.

The Art of Virtue placed third in Amazon.com's list of the best folk recordings of the year.  Young was invited to sing in Philadelphia on January 17, 2006, as part of Benjamin Franklin's 300th birthday celebration.

In May 2006 Young took her band to Levon Helm's studio in Woodstock, New York to record tracks for a third album, titled Room to Grow, which was released May 22, 2007.

Social and environmental action 

Young's second CD, The Art of Virtue released in 2005, took its theme from Benjamin Franklin's Thirteen Virtues and included copy of Franklin's pamphlet inside.  The title track addressed issues that Young found herself pondering after the 2004 re-election of George W. Bush, specifically how the Republican Party had leveraged the theme of morality as a campaign tool.  As she said at the time:

Since 2004 Young has been a spokeswoman for the FoodRoutes Network, which aims to aid organizations in rebuilding local, community-based food systems.  Young used the release of the CD The Art of Virtue to call attention to her involvement with the FoodRoutes Network, a non-profit organization that promotes sustainable agriculture and connects consumers with local farmers who are willing to sell direct.  Room to Grow furthers her involvement in this movement with lyrics and songs directly addressing the issue.

This wasn't the first time she mixed her farm action fever with artistic output: Plow to the End of the Row, her 2004 debut CD, came with a packet of seeds enclosed (and was nominated for the packaging design Grammy).

Young advocates locally-grown and sustainable agriculture. A portion of each record sold of Room to Grow goes to the Save A Seed fund, which she created with nonprofit organizations the FoodRoutes Network and the American Community Gardening Association. The money will provide non-genetically modified seeds to community gardens across North America.

Young has toured with help from the organization Buy Fresh Buy Local and each of the 49 FoodRoutes chapters. Along with her performances, each tour stop offered sustainable living workshops with local sponsors in each community. "Preserving cultural genetics and agricultural heritage is the key to true security and self-reliance", she says.

Young says her music has influenced her activism because she feels at peace in nature and wants to communicate those feelings through her music.

As of 2010, Adrienne Young has hosted and organized the Backyard Revolution, a group of people sharing and demonstrating unique skills of the past and present to help educate people in self sustainability.  The Backyard Revolution was present at Floyd Fest 9 (2010) and the Heritage Harvest Festival at Thomas Jefferson's Monticello. Demonstrations included: Backyard dairy cow (cow included), hide tanning and bow drill fire-making, home fermentation, historic log cabin construction, arrow fletching, soap making, primitive cooking, edible and medicinal wild plants, and more. See www.backyardrevolution.com for more information.

Sound and style 

Her music, created with various incarnations of her band Little Sadie, blends elements of Bluegrass, country, old-time music, and American folk music with a pop sensibility.

. . tightly crafted songs that, like the feel of her home and the flow of her conversation, infuse her love for American tradition with high contemporary energy. Young's vocals mirror weariness and hope on 'Natural Bridge,' cross intimate valleys and climb the emotional peaks of 'Room Enough To Grow,' simmer on the stone-country burner "High Flyin’ Dream", yearn to go wherever the current takes her on 'River and a Dirt Road.'

Awards and distinctions 

Plow to the End of the Row, her 2004 CD, came with a packet of seeds enclosed and was nominated for the packaging design Grammy
An early version of the disc, released on a limited basis in 2003, featured several tracks that were ultimately dropped or re-recorded for the national release in 2004. That first configuration included backing from the old-time music band Old Crow Medicine Show
The Plow to the End of the Row version originally released in 2003, was a top pick for 2003 Debut Artist by the Freeform American Roots DJ Chart
That version has become a sought-after collectible
The 2004 Just Plain Folks Music Awards named Plow to the End of the Row Roots Album of the Year, and the track "I Cannot Justify" Best Roots Songs of the Year
The Americana Music Association included Young and her band in their nominees for Emerging Artist of the Year
The Nashville Scene named "Home Remedy" as Best Country Single of the year.
The CD went on to place at or near the top of numerous "best of" lists for the year.
The Los Angeles Times called Young "the Americana music find of the year"
She won 2003 Chris Austin songwriting contest at MerleFest for "Sadie's Song"
The Art of Virtue placed third in Amazon.com's list of the best folk recordings of the year.
She was invited to sing in Philadelphia on January 17, 2006, as part of Benjamin Franklin's 300th birthday celebration.
Room to Grow made The Nashville Scene Top Five Albums From Singer-Songwriters December 20, 2007.

Discography

Albums

Singles
"Just Like Christmas" with Tim O'Brien (2004) AddieBelle (promo CD and download only) —

Music videos

Articles, reviews, interviews 
review of Room to Grow August/September 2007 Dirty Linen.
"Adrienne Young's Activism Keeps Her In Tune" by Eric R. Danton, Courant Rock Critic, August 17, 2007 Hartford Courant.
"Adrienne Young: Planting the Earth, Growing Herself" by Elizabeth Blair, broadcast July 9, 2007 on All Things Considered NPR.
"Adrienne Young's 'Plow to the End of the Row': Singer and Banjo Player Breathes New Life into an Old Form" by Melissa Block, broadcast April 14, 2004 on All Things Considered NPR.

References

External links

Official website Adrienne Young
YouTube Adrienne Young videos.
FoodRoutes Network
Adrienne Young at NPR Music

Living people
Year of birth missing (living people)
American women composers
21st-century American composers
American women singer-songwriters
American women country singers
American country singer-songwriters
American bluegrass musicians
American folk musicians
21st-century American singers
Musicians from Tallahassee, Florida
Singers from Nashville, Tennessee
Singer-songwriters from Florida
Belmont University alumni
21st-century American women singers
Country musicians from Tennessee
Country musicians from Florida
21st-century women composers
Singer-songwriters from Tennessee